Basem Al-Sherif  (born October 16, 1984) is a Saudi football player who plays a left defender .

References

1984 births
Living people
Saudi Arabian footballers
Al-Taawoun FC players
Abha Club players
Al-Raed FC players
Al-Orobah FC players
Al-Fayha FC players
Najran SC players
Al-Riyadh SC players
Al-Ansar FC (Medina) players
Place of birth missing (living people)
Saudi First Division League players
Saudi Second Division players
Saudi Professional League players
Association football defenders